Factory is an American comedy television series. The series received a six-episode order from Spike, where it premiered on June 29, 2008. The series, produced by 3 Arts Entertainment, was directed by and stars Mitch Rouse, and features fellow comedians Michael Coleman, Jay Leggett and David Pasquesi.

Plot
Factory is the story of four guys who grew up together in the same small town, who drank a lot of beer, and dreamt of one day making a name for themselves. The four guys are still friends and still drink a lot of beer, only now they all work in the town's local factory. When not figuring out new ways to avoid doing their jobs, the guys are usually trying to appease their wives and girlfriends, without great success.

Characters

 Gary (played by Mitch Rouse) – The unspoken leader and ladies' man of the group, Gary has been putting in long days at the factory for years, lately just to get away from his bi-polar wife.  He epitomizes the classic slacker-underachiever whose wit far outweighs his motivation.
 Smitty (played by David Pasquesi) – Smitty is the sarcastic one of the group, and he fancies himself an intellectual.  He currently lives in the same house as his ex-wife, but a glimmer of hope has shined on him in the form of his ex-wife's stepfather's sister's daughter (no relation).
 Gus (played by Jay Leggett) – Gus is currently working up the courage to propose to his live-in girlfriend of 11 years.  A big teddy bear of a guy, Gus occasionally manipulates his friends to get what he wants.
 Chase (played by Michael Coleman) – Chase is a naïve 12-year-old in the body of a 35-year-old linebacker, in desperate need of a girlfriend. His naiveté makes him the butt of many jokes, but his friends are always encouraging him to meet women, especially if it means they have the chance to live through him vicariously.

Episodes

References

External links
 
 Wizzard.tv/factory (archive).

Spike (TV network) original programming
2000s American sitcoms
2008 American television series debuts
2008 American television series endings
Television series by 3 Arts Entertainment